Veinerville is a hamlet in southern Alberta, Canada within Cypress County.

History 
The town was named after Mayor Henry Viener of Medicine Hat.

In the 1960s, a Medicine Hat Transportation Company bus route was slated to be enstated to the town, however there was little interest from residents. Later, a stop was made on the Flats route that was approximately 200 metres downhill from the town.

Demographics 

See also 
List of communities in Alberta
List of hamlets in Alberta

References 

Cypress County
Designated places in Alberta
Hamlets in Alberta